Manchester Central corps of the Salvation Army is the main Salvation Army church (corps) in the city of Manchester.

Located on the University of Manchester campus, the corps has a strong African flavour with a number of the congregation coming from Zimbabwe, together with its Shona-speaking choir.  Other nationalities worshiping there are/have included Zambian, Eritrean, Korean, Liberian, Italian, Namibian and Nigerian, as well as British members.

There is a strong outreach to students of the University of Manchester.

Manchester Central
Churches in Manchester
Salvationism in England